Longford Slashers is a Gaelic Athletic Association club located in Longford, County Longford, Ireland. The club is based at Michael Fay Park in Longford Town and has won the Longford Senior Football Championship 16 times - more than any other club in the county. It is the only club in the county which fields teams at football, hurling, ladies football and Camogie.

History
The Longford Slashers club was formed in 1954  when Longford Wanderers and Whiterock Slashers clubs amalgamated to form a new club. 

The club has won the Longford Senior Football Championship 16 times - 1954, 1956, 1957, 1959, 1961, 1971, 1975, 1979, 1980, 1989, 1990, 1991, 1994, 2010, 2011 & 2013.

The club has won the Longford Senior Hurling Championship 12 times - 1982, 1983, 1984, 1986, 1987, 1989, 1990, 1991, 1997, 2000, 2001, and 2021 (the hurling club was called Slashers Gaels until the mid-2000's when it was changed to Longford Slashers .

After the foundation of the Club in 1954, Longford Slashers was without a home of their own and depended on the goodwill of the Longford County Board to play many of their games in Pearse Park. The club also rented some fields locally at other times over the years. In 1978 the club purchased an initial  at Farneyhoogan on the outskirts of Longford town. Following extensive development work, the first two pitches were opened on 8 June 1980 - the first competitive game was a Leader Cup match V Ardagh. The Club grounds, Clubhouse, and other facilities were officially opened by the then President of Cumann Luthchleas Gael, Padraic McFlynn, on 12 October 1980.

On 25 April 2005, another milestone was reached when a new floodlit all-weather playing pitch was opened on an additional  of land that the club purchased. On 6 October 2013, Slashers won their 16th county Senior Football Championship title, defeating Dromard by 1-11 to 1-9, and are now the most successful Gaelic football team in County Longford.

Notable players
Gareth Ghee

Achievements
 Longford Senior Football Championship: 16
1954, 1956, 1957, 1959, 1961, 1971, 1975, 1979, 1980, 1989, 1990, 1991, 1994, 2010, 2011, 2013

The club also reached county finals in 1960, 1963, 1964, 1968, 1977, 1978, 1981, 1997, 2006, 2008, 2012 & 2019.

 Longford Senior Hurling Championship: 12
1982, 1983, 1984, 1986, 1987, 1989, 1990, 1991, 1997, 2000, 2001, 2021.

Under-age
Their club has underage football teams at U-8s, U-10s, U-12s, two U-14s, two U16s & Minor grades.
Longford Slashers have had success at the U-21 level in the county, including in 2004. In hurling, the club fields under-age teams from U-8 through to Minor level and has won titles at every grade, including National John West Féile na nGael cup champions in 2018 and 2019.

References

External links

 Article on Dessie Barry on Hoganstand.com
 Longford Slashers website
 Longford Gaelic Stats

Gaelic games clubs in County Longford
Sport in Longford (town)
Hurling clubs in County Longford
Gaelic football clubs in County Longford